The Centro de Estudios y Experimentación de Obras Públicas (CEDEX) is a civil engineering research agency in Spain. It was founded in 1957.

External links
CEDEX in English

Research institutes in Spain
Scientific organizations established in 1957
1957 establishments in Spain